Michael Coyle may refer to:

 Michael Patrick Coyle (born 1957), American composer
 Michael Coyle (politician) (born 1948), nationalist politician in Northern Ireland